The 1985 Virginia Slims of Los Angeles was a women's tennis tournament played on outdoor hard courts at the Manhattan Beach Country Club in Manhattan Beach, California in the United States and was part of the Category 4 tier of the 1985 Virginia Slims World Championship Series. It was the 12th edition of the tournament and was held from July 28 through August 4, 1985. Fifth-seeded Claudia Kohde-Kilsch won the singles title.

Finals

Singles
 Claudia Kohde-Kilsch defeated  Pam Shriver 6–2, 6–4
 It was Kohde-Kilsch' 1st singles title of the year and the 6th of her career.

Doubles
 Claudia Kohde-Kilsch /  Helena Suková defeated  Hana Mandlíková /  Wendy Turnbull 6–4, 6–2

See also
 1985 Volvo Tennis Los Angeles – men's tournament

References

External links
 ITF tournament edition details
 Tournament draws

Los Angeles
LA Women's Tennis Championships
Virginia Slims of Los Angeles
Virginia Slims of Los Angeles
Virginia Slims of Los Angeles
Virginia Slims of Los Angeles
Virginia Slims of Los Angeles